Crocus lydius is a species of flowering plant growing from a corm, native to western Turkey (Manisa).

References

lydius